This is an incomplete list of mountain peaks in the Pirin mountain range, south-western Bulgaria.

 
Mountain peaks, Pirin
Pirin
Landforms of Blagoevgrad Province